was a Japanese samurai who served under the shōgun Tokugawa Ieyasu. Shōsan was born in modern-day Aichi Prefecture of Japan. He participated in the Battle of Sekigahara and the Battle of Osaka before renouncing life as a warrior and becoming a Zen Buddhist monk in 1621.

Zen training
Shōsan traveled throughout Japan seeking out Zen masters and trained in several hermitages and temples, most notably at Myōshin-ji in Kyoto training under Gudō Toshoku (1577–1661). In 1636 Shōsan created a Zen booklet entitled Fumoto no Kusawake (or, Parting the Grasses at the Foot of the Mountain).

Shōsan trained under a little-known Zen master, Daigu Sochiku, who allowed Shōsan to keep his original name. Shōsan never actually received inka but was one of many in the Tokugawa period to claim jigo-jishō or "self-enlightenment without a teacher". He was a Zen Master who amassed a large following. In 1642, Shōsan, along with his brother, built 32 Buddhist temples in Japan. One was a Pure Land Buddhist temple in which he honoured the shōguns Tokugawa Ieyasu and Tokugawa Hidetada. Shōsan went on to write several treatises before his death in 1655 at 76 years old.

Niō Zen
Suzuki Shōsan developed his own style of Zen, Niō Zen, or Guardian King Zen. Shōsan instructed his students to meditate on the Niō, the fierce-looking Guardians that represent Vajrapani and can be seen at the gates of many Buddhist temples, to help them channel energy to use in meditation and in developing vitality, courage and "death energy" or the readiness to confront death at any moment which are the most important characteristics of a warrior.

Shosan's dedication to bringing Buddhism to people from all segments of society intensified as he grew older. He believed that the virtue of Buddhism depended on its usefulness to one's country and people in the real world. Shosan taught that true enlightenment comes during one's daily tasks. Whether one is "tilling fields, or selling wares, or even confronting an enemy in the heat of battle, direct enlightenment will occur at key moment's of one's day to day life". Shosan saw true enlightenment in an untraditional way by discarding the belief that enlightenment can only occur in matters of direct recluse or the renouncement, and therefore true Buddhism has nothing to do with "gentle piety or theory, even though most monks were taught to practice in this manner". Sometimes he asked learners to physically emulate the postures of the Niō, as well as other warrior deities like Fudo and Bishamonten, to aid them in concentration. The energy gained by thinking about the Niō was purported to help learners develop a warrior's fortitude, and to overcome the evil energies that inhibited them from progressing towards enlightenment.

Works
 , 1619
 Fumoto no Kusawake ("Parting the Grasses at the Foot of the Mountain"), 1636
 , 1642
 , 1648
 , 1664
 , 1661

References

Further reading
Warrior of Zen: The Diamond-Hard Wisdom Mind of Suzuki Shosan by Arthur Braverman
Nakamura Hajime, Johnston, William (1967). Suzuki Shōsan, 1579-1655 and the Spirit of Capitalism in Japanese Buddhism, Monumenta Nipponica 22 (1/2), 1-14

External links
Suzuki Shōsan memorial hall 

Samurai
People from Aichi Prefecture
Zen Buddhist monks
1579 births
1655 deaths
Japanese Zen Buddhists
Soto Zen Buddhists
Edo period Buddhist clergy